Rani Anna Government College for Women, is a general degree college located in Tirunelveli, Tamil Nadu. The college is named after Rani Annadurai, wife of  C N Annadurai, the first chief minister of Tamil Nadu. It was established in the year 1970. The college is affiliated with Manonmaniam Sundaranar University. This college offers different courses in arts, commerce and science.

Departments

Science
Physics
Chemistry
Mathematics
Botany
Zoology
Geology
Computer Science

Arts and Commerce
Tamil
English
Economics
History
Journalism and Mass Communication
Commerce
Sociology
Human Resource Development
Social Work

Accreditation
The college is  recognized by the University Grants Commission (UGC).

References

External links
http://raniannagcw.edu.in

Educational institutions established in 1970
1970 establishments in Tamil Nadu
Colleges affiliated to Manonmaniam Sundaranar University
Universities and colleges in Tirunelveli district